Hysterium is a genus of fungi belonging to the family Hysteriaceae.

The genus has cosmopolitan distribution.

Species

Species:

Hysterium acervulatum 
Hysterium aculearum 
Hysterium acuminatum

References

Hysteriales
Dothideomycetes genera